The 2004 Norwegian Football Cup was the 99th edition of the Norwegian Football Cup. The tournament was contested by 128 teams, going through 7 rounds before a winner could be declared. The final match was played on 7 November at Ullevaal stadion in Oslo. Brann won their 6th Norwegian Championship title after defeating Lyn in the final with the score 4–1.

The clubs from Tippeligaen all made it to round 3 (round of 32). However, six Tippeligaen teams - Vålerenga, Odd Grenland, Viking, Fredrikstad, Molde and Sogndal - were knocked out in the third round. The fourth round (round of 16) saw two more top tier clubs - Tromsø and Bodø/Glimt - being knocked out, leaving six Tippeligaen teams and two 1. divisjon teams the quarter-finals.

Brann won the cup, beating Lyn 4–1 in the final match.

Calendar
Below are the dates for each round as given by the official schedule:

First round

|colspan="3" style="background-color:#97DEFF"|5 May 2004

|-
|colspan="3" style="background-color:#97DEFF"|6 May 2004

|}

Second round

|colspan="3" style="background-color:#97DEFF"|26 May 2004

|-
|colspan="3" style="background-color:#97DEFF"|27 May 2004

|-
|colspan="3" style="background-color:#97DEFF"|28 May 2004

|}

Third round

|colspan="3" style="background-color:#97DEFF"|3 June 2004

|-
|colspan="3" style="background-color:#97DEFF"|9 June 2004

|-
|colspan="3" style="background-color:#97DEFF"|10 June 2004

|}

Fourth round

|colspan="3" style="background-color:#97DEFF"|23 June 2004

|-
|colspan="3" style="background-color:#97DEFF"|24 June 2004

|}

Bracket

Quarter-finals

Semi-finals

Final

Top goalscorers

References

Norwegian Football Cup seasons
Norwegian Football Cup
Football Cup